This article involves current Chinese People's Political Consultative Congress members who were last elected in March 2013.

The role that CPPCC plays in the Chinese government is stated in the preamble of the Constitution of the People's Republic of China. In practice, its role and powers are somewhat analogous to an advisory legislative upper house, and there have been occasional proposals to formalise this role in the PRC Constitution.

The Chinese Communist Party and its eight subservient United Front political parties participate in the CPPCC. Besides political parties, the CPPCC also invites of representatives from various sectors of society.

Current sectors 

As of 29 June 2017. Members are divided into several sectors, including political parties, people's organizations, etc.

References 

Chinese People's Political Consultative Conference